Cortland may refer to:

Places

In space
 27776 Cortland, an asteroid

United States
 Cortland, Illinois, a town
 Cortland, Indiana, an unincorporated community
 Cortland, Nebraska, a village
 Cortland, New York, a city
 Cortland, Ohio, a city
 Cortland, West Virginia, an unincorporated community
 Cortland, Wisconsin, a ghost town
 Cortland County, New York
 Cortland Township, DeKalb County, Illinois

People
 Cortland Finnegan (born 1984), American retired National Football League player

Other uses
 Cortland (apple)
 Cortland at Colliers Yard, a residential skyscraper in Salford, England
 One of the codenames of the Apple IIGS during its development
 , a World War II attack transport ship

See also
 Cortlandt (disambiguation)
 Courtland (disambiguation)
 State University of New York College at Cortland, informally known as SUNY Cortland or Cortland State